William James Baden Dallison (20 June 1900 – 25 March 1946) was a motorcycle speedway rider who rode in the earliest days of the sport in Britain.

Speedway career 
Dallison began riding for Hall Green Bulldogs during the 1930 Speedway Southern League and would remain one of the sports leading riders until the outbreak of World War II. He later became captain of the Birmingham team.

Dallison died suddenly at home, in Birmingham on 25 March 1946.

Players cigarette cards
Dallison is listed as number 11 of 50 in the 1930s Player's cigarette card collection.

References 

1900 births
1946 deaths
British speedway riders
Wimbledon Dons riders
Harringay Racers riders
Southampton Saints riders